The 2023 ABSA Cup will be the 16th edition of the annual knock-out competition in Zambian football contested by 6 teams from the Super League and the top 2 teams from the National Division One following the conclusion of match day 17 of the 2022–23 season.

It will be the 4th edition under the "ABSA Cup" name following ABSA's completed acquisition of the African assets and operations of Barclays in 2018.

NAPSA Stars are defending champions after beating Red Arrows 1–0 to win the previous edition's title in 2022.

Draw
At the conclusion of match day 17 of the 2022–23 Zambian football season, the Super League table's top 6 positions consisted of Forest Rangers, Red Arrows, Power Dynamos, Green Buffaloes, Green Eagles and Maestro United and the National Division One table's top 2 positions consisted of Mufulira Wanderers and Trident FC.

The draw was held at a relocated headquarters of Absa Bank Zambia in Lusaka on 1 March 2023. Green Buffaloes, Green Eagles, Red Arrows and Power Dynamos were seeded by virtue of their performances in the previous editions of the ABSA Cup with Mufulira Wanderers, Trident FC, Maestro United and Forest Rangers being unseeded.

Bracket

Matches
Kick-off times listed are in CAT (UTC+02:00).

Quarter-finals

Semi-finals

Final

Prize allocation and logistics
Absa Bank Zambia announced a tournament prize and logistical monetary increment a day before the draw ceremony, i.e. on 28 February 2023 which are as follows:

References

Football competitions in Zambia
2022–23 in Zambian football
2023 in Zambian sport